Cordle is a surname. Notable people with the surname include:

David Cordle (born 1954), American academic
Gerald Cordle (born 1960), Welsh rugby union and rugby league player
Jim Cordle (born 1987), American football player
John Cordle (1912–2004), British politician
Larry Cordle (born 1948), American singer-songwriter
Tony Cordle (born 1940), Barbadian cricketer